Yaqui Drums is a 1956 American Western film directed by Jean Yarbrough and starring Rod Cameron, J. Carrol Naish, Mary Castle.

Plot

Cast
 Rod Cameron as Webb Dunham 
 J. Carrol Naish as Vacqi Jack 
 Mary Castle as Linda Quigg   
 Robert Hutton as Lute Quigg  
 Roy Roberts as Matt Quigg  
 Denver Pyle as Lefty Barr  
 Ray Walker as Sheriff  
 Keith Richards as Prescott  
 G. Pat Collins as Bartender  
 Donald Kerr as Saloon Piano Player  
 Sol Gorss as Second Henchman  
 Paul Fierro as Leader  
 John Frederick as Hostler 
 Fred Gabourie as First Henchman

References

Bibliography
 Pitts, Michael R. Western Movies: A Guide to 5,105 Feature Films. McFarland, 2012.

External links

1956 films
1956 Western (genre) films
American Western (genre) films
Films directed by Jean Yarbrough
Allied Artists films
1950s English-language films
1950s American films
American black-and-white films